Undercarriage is the part of a moving vehicle that is underneath the main body of the vehicle. The term originally applied to this part of a horse-drawn carriage, and usage has since broadened to include:

The landing gear of an aircraft.
The chassis of an automobile.
The tractor treads of a tractor or tank.
 The underframe of a locomotive
The undercarriage assembly of a train car or locomotive, known as a bogie, incorporating the train wheel sets, suspension, brakes and, in powered units, the traction motors

See also
 Bicycle frame
 Container chassis
 Locomotive bed
 Locomotive frame
 Motorcycle frame